The 1988 London Marathon was the eighth running of the annual marathon race in London, United Kingdom, which took place on Sunday, 17 April. The elite men's race was won by Denmark's Henrik Jørgensen in a time of 2:10:20 hours and the women's race was won by Norway's Ingrid Kristiansen in 2:25:41.

In the wheelchair races, Canadian Ted Vince (2:01:37) and Britain's Karen Davidson (2:41:45) set course records in their wins of the men's and women's divisions, respectively. This was the first time a non-British athlete won one of wheelchair events.

Around 73,000 people applied to enter the race, of which 29,979 had their applications accepted and 22,469 started the race. A total of 20,932 runners finished the race – the first time the marathon had over 20,000 people achieve that.

Results

Men

Women

Wheelchair men

Wheelchair women

References

Results
Results. Association of Road Racing Statisticians. Retrieved 2020-04-23.

External links

Official website

1988
London Marathon
Marathon
London Marathon